Push the Beat for This Jam (The Second Chapter), alternatively titled Push the Beat for This Jam (The Singles '94–'02) in the UK and Australia and Pushing the Beat (The Best of Scooter) in the US, is the second singles compilation from the German techno band Scooter, released on 7 January 2002. It collects all the singles from 1998 to 2002 including the hit single "The Logical Song" plus three new tracks "Habanera", "No Pain, No Gain", "Loud And Clear", some live tracks, B-sides and remixes. The title is a lyric from the single "Call Me Mañana". The song Habanera was also scheduled to be released as a single but there is only a promo release as it was dropped in favour of a new song "Nessaja".

Track listing

UK version
To capitalise on the success of "The Logical Song" in the UK, a different version of the album was released there titled Push the Beat for This Jam (The Singles '94–'02). Released on 29 July 2002, it was certified Gold by the BPI on 23 August 2002, reaching a high of number six on the UK Albums Chart. The album contains singles spanning the group's whole career up to that point, with the following track listing.
"Hyper Hyper"
"Move Your Ass"
"Friends"
"Endless Summer"
"Back In The UK"
"Let Me Be Your Valentine"
"Rebel Yell"
"I'm Raving"
"How Much Is The Fish?"
"Fire"
"The Age Of Love"
"No Fate"
"The Logical Song"
"Posse (I Need You on the Floor)"
"Call Me Mañana"
"Fuck the Millennium"
"Aiii Shot the DJ"
"Faster Harder Scooter"
"Nessaja"

US version
In the United States, a version titled Pushing the Beat (The Best of Scooter) was released on 17 September 2002, with the following track listing.
"Nessaja"
"Aiii Shot The DJ"
"Posse (I Need You On The Floor)"
"I'm Your Pusher"
"Fuck The Millennium"
"Faster Harder Scooter"
"Call Me Mañana"
"We Are The Greatest"
"How Much Is The Fish?"
"Greatest Beats"
"New Year's Day"
"Sunrise (Ratty's Inferno)"
"Habanera - Big Room Mix"
"No Pain, No Gain"
"Loud And Clear"
"Monolake"
"Firth Of Forth"
"Ramp! (The Logical Song)"

Charts

Weekly charts

Year-end charts

References

Scooter (band) albums
2002 compilation albums